The 2008–09 Czech Extraliga season was the 16th season of the Czech Extraliga since its creation after the breakup of Czechoslovakia and the Czechoslovak First Ice Hockey League in 1993.

Standings

Playoffs

Preliminary round
HC Plzen - HC Ocleari Trinec 3-2 on series
HC Vitkovice Steel - Bili Tygri Liberec 3-0 on series

Quarterfinals
HC Slavia Praha - HC Vitkovice Steel 4-3 on series
HC Moeller Pardubice - HC Plzen 3-4 on series
HC Litvinov - HC Energie Karlovy Vary 0-4 on series
HC Sparta Praha - Rl Okna Zlin 4-1 on series

Semifinals
HC Slavia Praha - HC Plzen 4-1 on series
HC Energie Karlovy Vary - HC Sparta Praha 4-2 on series

Final
HC Energie Karlovy Vary - HC Slavia Praha 4-2 on series

Playouts

Relegation
 BK Mladá Boleslav – HC Slovan Ústečtí Lvi 4–0 (3–0, 2–1 OT, 3–1, 2–0)
 After season, the Extraliga licence was transferred from team HC Znojemští Orli to HC Kometa Brno.

References

External links 
 

2008-09
2008–09 in European ice hockey leagues
1